Wola Zabierzowska  is a village in the administrative district of Gmina Niepołomice, within Wieliczka County, Lesser Poland Voivodeship, in southern Poland.

References

Wola Zabierzowska